The Under Secretary of the Treasury for Domestic Finance is a high-ranking position within United States Department of the Treasury that reports to, advises, and assists the Secretary of the Treasury and the Deputy Secretary of the Treasury. The under secretary leads the department's policy on the issues of domestic finance, fiscal policy, fiscal operations, government assets, government liabilities, and other related economic and fiscal matters.

Under Secretary Mary J. Miller announced she was stepping down from the position on June 12, 2014, and the position was officially vacant until July 2021.

Matthew Rutherford served as acting Under Secretary until January 30, 2015. President Barack Obama nominated Antonio Weiss for the position on November 13, 2014. Weiss was never confirmed by the Senate, and withdrew his nomination on January 12, 2015. On April 22, 2021 President Joe Biden nominated economist Nellie Liang for Senate confirmation in the position. Liang was confirmed by the Senate on July 14, 2021.

Overview
The Under Secretary has oversight of the following:
Assistant Secretary of the Treasury for Financial Institutions
Office of Financial Institutions
Office of Financial Institutions Policy
Office of Consumer Policy
Office of Housing, Small Business, and Community Development
Community Development Financial Institutions Fund
Assistant Secretary of the Treasury for Financial Markets
Office of Financial Markets
Office of Federal Finance
Office of Government Financial Policy
Office of Capital Markets
Assistant Secretary of the Treasury for Financial Stability
Office of Financial Stability
Fiscal Assistant Secretary of the Treasury
Office of Fiscal Service
Office of Fiscal Operations and Policy
Office of Accounting Policy
Bureau of the Fiscal Service

List of Under Secretaries of the Treasury for Domestic Finance (Incomplete)

References